The Chicago Pirates was a baseball team in the Players' League for a single season in 1890.  The team played its home games at South Side Park (II). Their rivals were the National League Chicago White Stockings, which later became the Cubs.

The Pirates recruited most of the White Stocking's players, and for this reason the Pirates’ attendance was nearly fifty percent higher than the White Stockings. The Pirates’ owner, John Addison, was a wealthy contractor. Although Addison and his partner White Stocking second baseman Fred Pfeffer had signed mostly White Stocking players, they also signed four players from the St. Louis Browns of the American Association as well as a pitcher from the Columbus Solons of the American Association. The team was managed by Charles Comiskey.

Notable players
Charles Comiskey
Hugh Duffy
Silver King
Jimmy Ryan
Ned Williamson 
Tip O'Neill

Comiskey and Duffy are members of the Baseball Hall of Fame.  On June 21, 1890, Silver King pitched the only ever Player's League no-hitter.
The team had two nicknames:  1) White Stockings - player wore white hose - which was appropriate because this PL franchise signed away many NL Chicago White Stocking players, 2) Pirates - name applied not for "pirating" away NL players but rather because the team "pirated" many victories with late inning comebacks in games in which they trailed early. Source:  BASEBALL TEAM NAMES 1869–2012, Rick Worth.

See also
 1890 Chicago Pirates season
 Chicago Pirates all-time roster

References

External links
Baseball Almanac
Baseball Reference 
Sports Illustrated

 
Defunct Major League Baseball teams
Players' League teams
Pirates
Defunct baseball teams in Illinois
Baseball teams disestablished in 1890
Baseball teams established in 1990